Demos Vol. 1 + Vol. 2 is a demo album released by King Gizzard & the Lizard Wizard on September 29, 2020, exclusively through bandcamp and vinyl. It compiles demos and unreleased tracks ranging from the band's entire career. It was originally released as two separate albums (Vol. 1 Music to Kill Bad People To and Vol. 2 Music to Eat Bananas To) but was eventually compiled into one.

Track listing 
Vol. 1 Music to Kill Bad People To

 "Music To Kill Bad People To" - 4:19
 "Evil Death Roll (Demo)" - 4:32
 "Dirt (Demo)" - 3:16
 "BIT BIT BIT BIT BIT BIT BIT" - 2:11
 "Sketches of Brunswick East (Demo)" - 4:30
 "Demo No. 79" - 2:07
 "Planet B (Demo)" - 3:57
 "The Bird Song (Demo 1)" - 3:15
 "Muddy Water (Demo)" - 2:01
 "Mars For The Rich (Demo 1)" - 2:04
 "Footy Footy (Demo)" - 1:38
 "Stevie Ray Horn" - 3:19
 "Automation (Demo)" - 2:56
 "Fishing For Fishies (Demo)" - 4:23

Total length: 44:28

Vol. 2 Music to Eat Bananas To

 "Music To Eat Bananas To" - 3:12
 "The Spider And Me (Demo)" - 2:43
 "Most Of What I Like (Demo)" - 4:04
 "9 TET" - 2:17
 "Demo No. 67" - 2:14
 "Danger $$$ (Demo)" - 1:35
 "Horology (Demo)" - 1:35
 "Honey (Demo 1)" - 4:27
 "The 10th Boogie" - 3:58
 "Let It Bleed (Demo)" - 2:37
 "Tezeta (Demo)" - 2:13
 "Scared Of Christmas" - 2:12
 "Sleepwalker (Demo)" - 2:40
 "Straws In The Wind (Demo)" - 11:20

Total length: 45:32

Charts

References 

2020 compilation albums
Demo albums
King Gizzard & the Lizard Wizard albums
Bootleg recordings